The following is a list of the 23 cantons of the Hauts-de-Seine department, in France, following the French canton reorganisation which came into effect in March 2015:

 Antony
 Asnières-sur-Seine
 Bagneux
 Boulogne-Billancourt-1
 Boulogne-Billancourt-2
 Châtenay-Malabry
 Châtillon
 Clamart
 Clichy
 Colombes-1
 Colombes-2
 Courbevoie-1
 Courbevoie-2
 Gennevilliers
 Issy-les-Moulineaux
 Levallois-Perret
 Meudon
 Montrouge
 Nanterre-1
 Nanterre-2
 Neuilly-sur-Seine
 Rueil-Malmaison
 Saint-Cloud

References